San Pedro Jácuaro, or simply San Pedro, is a small town located about 110 Kilometers from Morelia, the Capital of the State of Michoacán, the two are connected by Mexican Federal Highway 15, but an alternate route is available which utilizes road 126, the first route Mexico 15 is usually avoided because of the treacherous road known as "Mil Cumbres", (thousand hills).  Some of the surrounding towns, known as "Suburbs" are: San Matias El Grande, Tierras Coloradas, Cuchupitio and La Venta.  The closest city areCiudad Hidalgo, often referred to as Ciudad de Hidalgo, and Los Azufres.

San Pedro produces and exports furniture, cattle, pork and lamb, sugar cane and corn.  In San Pedro there are a local school, a church, a soccer field and a basketball court.  High school, a primary school from first grade to sixth, kindergarten and a middle school grades seventh to ninth grade and a high school, haven't had any changes since the nineties.

References

Populated places in Michoacán